Sybil Kennedy (13 August 1899 – 5 June 1986) was a Canadian sculptor. Her work was part of the sculpture event in the art competition at the 1948 Summer Olympics.

References

External links
 

1899 births
1986 deaths
20th-century Canadian sculptors
20th-century Canadian women artists
Canadian women sculptors
Olympic competitors in art competitions
Artists from Quebec City